This is a list of strippers.

Strippers of the past 

 Ann Corio
 April March (born Velma Fern Worden)
 Bernie Barker, world's oldest male stripper
 Blaze Starr (born Fannie Belle Fleming)
 Candy Barr (born Juanita Dale Slusher)
 Carol Doda (born Carol Ann Doda)
 Charmion
 Chesty Morgan (born Ilona Wilczkowska)
 Faith Bacon (born Frances Yvonne Bacon)
 Fanne Foxe (born Annabel Villagra)
 Glenda Kemp
 Gypsy Rose Lee (aka Rose Louise Hovick, Louise Hovick)
 Jennie Lee (aka The Bazoom Girl)
 Josephine Baker/Joséphine Baker
 Jean Mode
 Lili St. Cyr (born Willis Marie Van Schaack)
 Louise Wightman (Princess Cheyenne)
 Mara Gaye (born Marjorie Helen Ginsberg)
 Mata Hari (born Margaretha Geertruida [Grietje] Zelle)
 Maud Allan
 Phyllis Dixey
 Sally Rand (born Harriet Helen Gould Beck)
 Satan's Angel (born Angel Cecelia Helene Walker)
 Sayuri Ichijō, Japan's most famous sex performer of the early 1970s, and star of director Tatsumi Kumashiro's Ichijo's Wet Lust (1972)
 Tempest Storm (born Annie Blanche Banks)
 Evelyn West (born Amy Mae Coomer)
 Vednita Carter

Contemporary strippers 

 Australia's Thunder from Down Under, international male review
 Anna Nicole Smith (Born: Vickie Lynn Marshall), former TV personality
 Brianna Taylor, reality show personality, singer and songwriter
 Cardi B, rapper 
 Channing Tatum, American fashion model, actor, and film producer
 Chippendales, a male dancer franchise
 Courtney Love, front person for the American band Hole
 Danni Ashe, an erotic model and pioneer businesswoman in online adult industry
 Dita Von Teese (born Heather Renée Sweet), an American burlesque artist, model and actress
 Diablo Cody, noted for writing a memoir about her year as a stripper
 Elisabeth Eaves, former stripper and author
 Heather Veitch, founder of JC's Girls, ministry offering strippers resources on pursuing a life outside of the adult entertainment industry
 Sunny Leone, former stripper and Indian film actress
 Stormy Daniels, stripper and pornographic actress
 Jenna Jameson,  entrepreneur and former leading pornographic actress
 Lady Gaga, (born Stefani Joanne Angelina Germanotta) American pop recording artist
 Lily Burana, former stripper and author of Strip City
 Morganna (born Morganna Roberts), former stripper and exotic dancer for the Flamingo Club in Baltimore, aka "Morganna the Kissing Bandit", known for her numerous stunts involving kissing baseball players during games.
 Missy Malone, Scottish burlesque performer, actress and model
 ppcocaine, rapper and TikTok celebrity.
 Andressa Urach, Former Brazilian stripper, now pastor.
 Tila Tequila (born Tila Nguyễn), singer, model, and television personality

See also 
 List of strip clubs
 Behind the Burly Q, a 2010 documentary about the golden age of burlesque.

References 

 

Strippers
Strippers